Yarlagab (fl. late 3rd millennium BCE) was the 7th Gutian ruler of the Gutian Dynasty of Sumer mentioned on the "Sumerian King List" (SKL). According to the SKL: Yarlagab was the successor of Igeshaush. Ibate then succeeded Yarlagab, likewise according to the SKL.

See also

 History of Sumer
 List of Mesopotamian dynasties

References

Gutian dynasty of Sumer